137 Meliboea is a large, dark main-belt asteroid that was discovered by Austrian astronomer J. Palisa at the Austrian Naval Observatory on 21 April 1874, the second of his many asteroid discoveries. It was later named after one of the three Meliboeas in Greek mythology. The largest body in the Meliboea family of asteroids that share similar orbital elements, only 791 Ani approaches its size. It is classified as a C-type asteroid and may be composed of carbonaceous materials. The spectra of the asteroid displays evidence of aqueous alteration.

Photometric observations of this asteroid made at the Torino Observatory in Italy during 1990–1991 were used to determine a synodic rotation period of 15.28 ± 0.02 hours. A 2009 study at the Organ Mesa Observatory in Las Cruces, New Mexico found a period of 25.676 ± 0.001 hours and a brightness variation of 0.16 ± 0.02 in magnitude. They ruled out a period of 15 hours determined in previous studies.

During 2002, 137 Meliboea was observed by radar from the Arecibo Observatory. The return signal matched an effective diameter of 144 ± 16 km. This is consistent with the asteroid dimensions computed through other means.

References

External links 
 
 

000137
Discoveries by Johann Palisa
Named minor planets
000137
18740421